The Finnish national futsal team represents Finland in international futsal competitions. The team is run under supervision of the Football Association of Finland. It has never qualified for the World Cup or the European Championships. On 29.7.2022 rankings Finland is 18th globally and 11th in Europe.

History 

The Finnish national futsal team was formed for the first time in 1994 when Finland participated in the World University Futsal Championship held in Cyprus. The World University Futsal Championship was held in Jyväskylä, Finland two years later. The first official international matches were played on October 21 and 22, 1998 against Hungary. Later that year Finland also participated in the qualifiers for the 1999 UEFA Futsal Championship tournament with futsal national team coach Timo Liekoski, but failed to qualify.

Simo Syrjävaara was selected as national futsal team coach at the end of year 1999. During Syrjävaara's spell, the team has participated twice in FIFA Futsal World Championship qualifiers and three times in UEFA Futsal Championship qualifiers. In these qualifiers, the team won only twice and lost total of 14 times. After Syrjävaara stepped down, rising talent Jouni Pihlaja took over coaching the team from the beginning of year 2005.

International Competitions

FIFA Futsal World Cup

UEFA European Futsal Championship

Nordic Futsal Cup

Players

Current squad
The following players were called up to the squad for the UEFA 2024 FIFA Futsal World Cup qualification matches against Romania and Denmark on 1 and 8 March 2023, respectively.

Recent call-ups
The following players have also been called up to the squad within the last 12 months.

COV Player withdrew from the squad due to contracting COVID-19.
INJ Player withdrew from the squad due to an injury.
PRE Preliminary squad.
RET Retired from international futsal.

Season 2018-2019

Futsal national team games 2010-11

References 

European national futsal teams
Futsal in Finland
National sports teams of Finland